Burton Wilbur Abbott (February 8, 1928 – March 15, 1957) was a University of California at Berkeley accounting student living in Alameda, California, who was convicted in November 1955 of the rape and murder of 14-year-old Stephanie Bryan.

Abbott's wife discovered the evidence in their home's basement and Stephanie's body was found buried near the Abbott family's cabin. He was sentenced to die in California's gas chamber. On March 15, 1957, a (second) one-hour stay of execution from the governor of California was communicated to the prison just moments too late to halt his execution.

The case is sometimes cited when discussing the appropriateness of condemning a person based on circumstantial evidence alone. However, "most criminal convictions are based on circumstantial evidence, although it must be adequate to meet established standards of proof."

Before his execution, Abbott spoke to the doctor at San Quentin. The doctor said that when he asked Abbott about the crime, he said "I can't admit it, doc. Think of what it would do to my mother; she couldn't take it."

Murder and investigation
Stephanie Bryan was last seen on April 28, 1955, walking home from school where she went through the parking lot of the Claremont Hotel in the Berkeley Hills. A large-scale search failed to find her. In mid-July, Georgia Abbott, Burton Abbott's wife, reported finding personal effects which had belonged to the girl, including a purse and an ID card, in the basement of the Abbotts' home in Alameda. The basement was in the home she shared with her husband, their son Christopher, and Burton's mother, Elsie Abbott (née Moore).

In interviewing the Abbotts, the police learned that Elsie Abbott had found the purse earlier, but said she did not connect it with the case. She would profess her son's innocence until she died.

Police subsequently recovered Stephanie's glasses, a brassiere, and other evidence in the basement. No one in the family could account for how the victim's personal effects came to be there.

Burton Abbott told multiple, contradictory stories including that he had been at the family's cabin 285 miles away near Weaverville, California, in Trinity County, when Stephanie disappeared.

On July 20, 1955, the victim's body was found by San Francisco Examiner reporter Ed Montgomery in a shallow grave a few hundred feet from the cabin, and Abbott was charged with her rape and murder.

Trial
The trial was one of the most highly publicized in California history. The prosecution hypothesis was that Abbott had attempted to rape the victim and killed her when she resisted. Abbott pleaded not guilty.

He explained that in May, the basement of the house had been used as a polling site with many people having access. Although the prosecution charged Abbott with attempted rape, the pathologist testified that the body was too decomposed to evaluate it for evidence of sexual assault.

Abbott took the stand and testified for four days. He was cocky and irate He spoke in a soft voice and was steadfast in his denials of any knowledge of the crime. He said it was all a "monstrous frame-up". The jury was out seven days before it returned a verdict of guilty of first degree murder. The judge imposed the death sentence.

As provided by California law, there was an automatic appeal to the Supreme Court of California. In a detailed opinion describing the facts of the case and reciting the evidence that had been presented at trial, the court affirmed the conviction and the sentence of death.

Execution
Abbott was incarcerated at San Quentin to await execution. His lawyers tried to appeal for over a year.

On March 15, 1957, the day of the execution which was scheduled for 10:00 am, Abbott's attorney appealed to the United States Court of Appeals and was denied. He then tried to contact the governor of California, Goodwin J. Knight, but the governor was on a naval ship, out at sea, and out of reach of the telephone. The attorney arranged with a TV station to broadcast a plea to the governor.

At 9:02 Governor Knight, now reachable by telephone, granted a one-hour stay. Within six minutes a writ of habeas corpus was presented to the Supreme Court of California, but at 10:42 am the petition was denied. The attorney tried again with an appeal to the U.S. District Court, but that court refused a further postponement at 10:50 am.

At 11:12 am Governor Knight was reached again and agreed to another stay. At 11:15 am Abbott was led to the gas chamber and strapped into the chair while the governor was contacting the warden by telephone. The executioner pulled the lever three minutes later and 16 pellets of sodium cyanide dropped into a vat of sulfuric acid as Knight reached the prison warden to stay the execution. The warden told him it was too late, and Abbott died as the governor hung up the telephone.

References

External links
Execution 1957
Historical Dictionary of the 1950s
Reflections  on the hangman and his rope 

1928 births
1957 deaths
1955 murders in the United States
American people executed for murder
20th-century executions by California
20th-century executions of American people
People convicted of murder by California
Executed people from Oregon
American murderers of children
American rapists
American male criminals
People executed by California by gas chamber